Anna Wielgosz, née Sabat (born 9 November 1993) is a Polish middle-distance runner specialising in the 800 metres. She won the bronze medal at the 2022 European Athletics Championships, having previously finished fifth in 2018.

Wielgosz represented Poland in the 800 metres at the 2020 Tokyo Olympics. She is a three-time Polish national champion in the event.

International competitions

1Representing Europe

Personal bests
 800 metres – 1:59.84 (Chorzów 2022)
 800 metres indoor – 2:02.79 (Toruń 2021)

References

External links

 

1993 births
Living people
Polish female middle-distance runners
Polish Athletics Championships winners
World Athletics Championships athletes for Poland
People from Nisko
Athletes (track and field) at the 2020 Summer Olympics
Olympic athletes of Poland
20th-century Polish women
21st-century Polish women
European Athletics Championships medalists